Tom and Jerry: The Lost Dragon is a 2014 animated fantasy comedy direct-to-video film starring Tom and Jerry, produced by Warner Bros. Animation. Directed and produced by Spike Brandt and Tony Cervone, it premiered on July 27, 2014, at San Diego Comic-Con. It is the first Tom and Jerry direct-to-video film to be distributed by Warner Bros. Home Entertainment in Japan. It was originally released digitally on August 19, 2014, followed by a DVD release on September 2, 2014.

Plot 
The film begins showing wizard Kaldorf expelling a powerful witch named Drizelda from a village for multiple crimes. Kaldorf allows Drizelda's mistreated niece Athena to stay. The elf villagers fear she will turn out like her aunt because she keeps vermin (Jerry) and has an affection for cats (Tom). The cat and mouse in this timeline are babies and become friends/frenemies along with Athena, who is only a barefoot girl.

The film fast forwards to Tom and Jerry chasing each other, as they usually do, and Athena caring for hurt animals, until the three happen to come across a mysterious glowing egg. What neither of them know is that this egg was stolen from a very large, fire-breathing dragon. In a short time, a baby dragon named Puffy hatches from this egg and believes that Tom is his mother, and the three take good care of him.

However, Puffy's real mother is angered that her baby is missing and wants him back, but before Tom, Jerry and Athena can even try to find her, Drizelda returns and captures Puffy, intending to use him for her own wicked plans — she is trying to steal his heat to become a super-dragon herself and destroy everything in the village. With the help of powerful allies and animal friends, Tom, Jerry and Athena work together and fight tooth and claw to stop the evil witch and get Puffy back to his mother, eventually, Drizelda is turned into a statue, and the villagers, Tom, Jerry, Kaldorf and even Athena are having a happy singing party.

After the credits, despite being turned into a statue, Drizelda is shown to still be alive. As a bird tries to perch on her, she breathes a puff a smoke from her nose, replying "Don't even think about it!", scaring away the bird.

Voice cast 
 Spike Brandt as Tom Cat and Jerry Mouse (uncredited)
 Kelly Stables as Athena and Puffy
 Vicki Lewis as Drizelda, Athena's abusive maternal aunt and the main antagonist
 Jim Cummings as Kaldorf and Seller
 Laraine Newman as Emily, the Elf Elder's Wife
 Greg Ellis as Tin
 Jess Harnell as Pan
 Richard McGonagle as Alley
 Wayne Knight as The Elf Elder
 Dee Bradley Baker as Buster and Elf Boy

Reception 

Renee Schonfeld of Common Sense Media gave the episode a 3 out of 5 stating "the engaging story [...] has more emotional impact than most".

Follow-up film 
Tom and Jerry: Spy Quest was released on June 23, 2015.

References

External links 
 

2014 films
2010s American animated films
2014 direct-to-video films
2014 animated films
American children's animated adventure films
American children's animated comedy films
American children's animated fantasy films
American fantasy adventure films
2010s children's fantasy films
Animated films about dragons
Films directed by Spike Brandt
Films directed by Tony Cervone
Films scored by Michael Tavera
Tom and Jerry films
Warner Bros. Animation animated films
Warner Bros. direct-to-video animated films
2010s children's animated films
2010s English-language films